was a Japanese man convicted for serial killings in his teenage years. He is also known as Hamamatsu Deaf Killer. He was convicted of stabbing to death at least nine people, including several teenagers, in the Shizuoka Prefecture. The book, which included the subject of the incident, was published in October 2007.

Early life 
Seisaku Nakamura was born deaf. He was intelligent, achieving high marks at school, but was treated poorly by his family and was a social misfit. He enjoyed films where men used Japanese swords to assassinate  people.

Murders 
According to his testimony, on August 22, 1938, he attempted to rape two women; they resisted him, so he murdered them. He was 14 years old at that time. However, the two murders are often excluded from his serial murders.

On August 18, 1941, at the age of 17, Nakamura killed a third woman and injured a fourth. On August 20, 1941, three more people were found dead, murdered by Nakamura. On September 27, 1941, he murdered his brother, and injured his father, his sister, his sister-in-law and his niece. On August 30, 1942, he murdered a couple, their daughter, and their son, and attempted to rape another daughter.

Information about his crimes were restricted because many thought news about his crimes would cause excessive trouble during the already tense war time, so Nakamura went unapprehended for longer than he might have otherwise. His family knew that he was responsible for the deaths but were afraid of revenge and did not come forward.

Arrest, trial, and execution 
He was arrested for nine murders on October 12, 1942. He also admitted two others. On November 11, his father  committed suicide. The doctors claimed that he was not guilty by reason of insanity. However, the trial proceeded rapidly and he was executed soon after.

The book,  discussed the incident. It was published in October 2007.

See also 
 List of serial killers by country
 List of serial killers by number of victims

References 

1920s births
1940s deaths
20th-century executions by Japan
Japanese deaf people
Executed Japanese serial killers
Executed mass murderers
Family murders
Fratricides
Japanese mass murderers
Japanese murderers of children
Japanese people convicted of murder
Japanese rapists
Male serial killers
Minors convicted of murder
People convicted of murder by Japan
People executed by Japan by hanging
People from Shizuoka Prefecture